is a female Japanese judoka. Shintani won a gold medal at the women's open category of the 2005 World Judo Championships in Cairo.

She won a silver medal at the +78 kg category of the 2001 World Judo Championships in Munich.
She won a bronze medal at the +78 kg category of the 2006 Asian Games.

External links
 

Japanese female judoka
1980 births
Living people
Sportspeople from Wakayama Prefecture
People from Kinokawa, Wakayama
Place of birth missing (living people)
University of Tsukuba alumni
Asian Games medalists in judo
Judoka at the 2002 Asian Games
Judoka at the 2006 Asian Games
Asian Games bronze medalists for Japan
Medalists at the 2006 Asian Games
Universiade medalists in judo
Universiade gold medalists for Japan
Universiade silver medalists for Japan
Medalists at the 1999 Summer Universiade
20th-century Japanese women
21st-century Japanese women